Cat's Eye (also known as Stephen King's Cat's Eye) is a 1985 American anthology horror thriller film directed by Lewis Teague and written by Stephen King. It comprises three stories, "Quitters, Inc.", "The Ledge", and "General". The first two are adaptations of short stories in King's 1978 Night Shift collection, and the third is unique to the film. The three stories are connected only by the presence of a traveling cat, which plays an incidental role in the first two and is a major character of the third.

Its cast includes Drew Barrymore, James Woods, Alan King, Robert Hays and Candy Clark.

Plot

A stray tabby cat hides from a dog in a delivery truck, which drives to New York City. The tomcat sees the disembodied image of a young girl pleading for help and is picked up by a man named Junk.

"Quitters, Inc."
Smoker, Dick Morrison is advised by a friend to join Quitters, Inc. to kick his habit. Clinic counselor Vinnie Donatti explains that the clinic has a 100% success rate due to a uniquely persuasive method: every time Dick smokes a cigarette, horrors of increasing magnitude will befall his wife and child.

Using the tomcat that Donatti's assistant, Junk, caught in the street, Donatti demonstrates the first of these horrors: the tomcat is put in a cage and tormented with electric shocks coming from the floor. Donatti explains that if his new client is caught with a cigarette, Dick's wife Cindy will be shocked while he is forced to watch. For subsequent infractions, his daughter will be shocked, then his wife raped. Finally, Dick himself will be killed. Dick hides the threats from his family.

That night, Dick is angered by the methods Quitters, Inc. uses and notices a pack of cigarettes in his desk. He prepares to smoke, but notices a pair of feet in his closet, realizing Quitters Inc. takes their threat seriously. The following day, Dick visits his daughter and gives her a doll. Whilst at the school, Dick sees Donatti, who warns him that the organization will be watching him closely.

During a stressful traffic jam, Dick smokes after finding an old pack of cigarettes in his glove box. After watching Cindy suffer in the electric cage, Dick futilely attacks Donatti and Junk; the tomcat escapes in the scuffle. Dick is determined never to smoke again and tells his wife everything.

Time passes, and Dick is smoke-free, but has gained weight due to quitting. Donatti prescribes illegal diet pills and sets a target weight for Dick. Dick jokingly asks what will happen if he continues to gain weight; Donatti responds that someone will cut off his wife's little finger. Dick and his wife have a dinner party with the friend who recommended Quitters, Inc. to Dick and his wife, and toast the company. As she raises her glass, Dick sees that his friend's wife is missing her little finger.

"The Ledge"
Having escaped Quitters, Inc., the tomcat leaves Manhattan via the Staten Island Ferry, traveling to Atlantic City, New Jersey, where it sees the same disembodied girl's image asking for his help. Gambler and former tennis pro Johnny Norris is involved with a woman whose jealous husband, Cressner, is a crime boss and casino owner. Cressner, who will bet on anything, wins a wager that the tomcat will successfully cross the busy road outside his casino, and takes the tomcat home.

Cressner has Norris kidnapped and blackmails him into a dangerous ordeal: he must circumnavigate the exterior ledge of Cressner's penthouse. If he makes it all the way around, Cressner will grant his wife a divorce. If Norris refuses, Cressner will call the police and have him arrested for possession of drugs that have been planted in Norris's Mustang by a henchman named Albert.

Norris agrees. Cressner harasses Norris by startling him with a horn when he attempts to get into a window. A pigeon lands beside Norris and pecks at his foot, causing it to bleed, then Cressner turns on a fire hose to keep Norris from lingering. Norris returns to the apartment. Cressner says he will honor his bet: Albert removed the drugs, and presents Norris with a bag of cash—however, he kicks over the bag to reveal his wife's severed head. Norris attacks Cressner, while Albert is tripped by the tomcat and drops his gun. Norris seizes the gun and kills Albert, then points it at Cressner. Norris forces Cressner to undergo the same ordeal on the ledge. The tomcat watches as Cressner, harassed by the pigeon, falls to his death.

"General"
The tomcat hops a freight train and travels to Wilmington, North Carolina, where it is adopted by the girl who was asking for help earlier, Amanda, who names him General. Amanda's mother believes General will harm their parakeet, Polly.

Despite Amanda's protests, her mother puts General out at night. Consequently, he cannot protect Amanda from a small, malevolent troll that took up residence in the house. When Amanda sleeps, the troll emerges via a hole in one of the walls in Amanda's room. The troll slays the parakeet with a tiny dagger and then tries to steal Amanda's breath. General finds a way into the house and chases the troll. After wounding the tomcat's shoulder with his dagger, the troll flees, leaving Amanda and her parents to discover the dead bird. Amanda's parents are convinced that General killed Polly, but her father, discovering a wound on the tomcat too large for a parakeet to have made, starts doubting the mother's belief that General slew the bird.

Amanda's mother takes General to an animal shelter to be euthanized. When night falls, the troll returns and uses a doorstop to wedge Amanda's door shut, and then reattempts to take the sleeping girl's breath. As General is getting his final meal, he escapes and rushes back to Amanda's house.

General saves Amanda and fights with the troll, causing a great deal of noise. Amanda's parents awaken, but the blocked door prevents them from reaching her. Though the troll tries to flee, General kills it. After her parents break into the room, Amanda describes how General saved her from the troll. Her parents believe the story when parts of the troll's corpse are discovered, as well as the tiny dagger and the hole in the wall that the troll used.

The next morning, General feasts on a large fish, then climbs onto a sleeping Amanda's stomach and licks her face. She wakes up and cuddles him.

Cast

 Drew Barrymore credited as "Our Girl". Also appears, uncredited, as Alicia Morrison, the Girl on TV, and Amanda
 James Woods as Dick Morrison
 Candy Clark as Sally Ann
 Alan King as Dr. Vinny Donatti
 Mary D'Arcy as Cindy Morrison
 Robert Hays as Johnny Norris
 Kenneth McMillan as Cressner
 James Naughton as Hugh
 James Rebhorn as Drunk Businessman
 Charles S. Dutton as Dom
 Mike Starr as Ducky

Release and reception
Cat's Eye was released theatrically in the United States by MGM on April 12, 1985.  It grossed $13,086,298 at the domestic box office.

Roger Ebert gave the film three stars out of four and wrote, "Stephen King seems to be working his way through the reference books of human phobias, and 'Cat's Eye' is one of his most effective films." Vincent Canby of The New York Times called the film "the best screen adaptation of any of King's work since Brian De Palma's 'Carrie'" and "pop movie making of an extremely clever, stylish and satisfying order." Variety wrote, "The three stories just don't connect and efforts to join them never work. However, an excellent roster of talent does try its best." Gene Siskel of the Chicago Tribune gave the film two-and-a-half stars out of four and wrote that the opening story "is so funny and so fresh that it's a shock and a disappointment to see it come to an end in a half-hour. The movie's second short story is as dull as can be; No. 3 is kind of fun; so it all adds up to a better-than-average entertainment that sags terribly in the middle." Kevin Thomas of the Los Angeles Times stated that "the special effects are impeccable and Giorgio Postiglione's production design meticulous and inspired. Yet it's the well-drawn characters, plus the brisk, stylish direction of Teague and superb camerawork of Cardiff, that make it work." Paul Attanasio of The Washington Post wrote that all the stories "repeat the same formula," but the middle one was "the most fun, because of the presence of the peerless Kenneth McMillan," who "plays here with a good-humored burlesque that recalls Jackie Gleason." Kim Newman of The Monthly Film Bulletin thought the film "would have been sub-standard even as one of the formula Amicus anthologies of the 60s and 70s," adding, "Despite a few good performances (James Woods, Kenneth McMillan), the film, like Creepshow before it, is continually let down by the weak punch lines King provides for his promising anecdotes." 
On Rotten Tomatoes, the film has a 70% rating based on 30 reviews. The critical consensus reads: "An effective if knowingly silly Stephen King anthology that combines comedy and terror." On Metacritic the film has a score of 70% based on reviews from 12 critics.

Neil Gaiman reviewed Cat's Eye for Imagine magazine, stating it was "Funny, scary, and one of the best King movies so far."

The film was released on VHS in 1985 by Key Video and later on DVD by Warner Home Video in 2002.

Awards
The film was nominated for the International Fantasy Film Award for Best Film in 1987. Drew Barrymore was nominated for the Young Artist Award for Best Starring Performance by a Young Actress in a Motion Picture in 1986.

See also
 Creepshow
 List of adaptations of works by Stephen King

References

External links
 
 
 

1985 films
American horror anthology films
Films about cats
Films about smoking
Films based on short fiction
Films based on multiple works
Films based on works by Stephen King
1985 horror films
1980s English-language films
Films directed by Lewis Teague
Films with screenplays by Stephen King
Metro-Goldwyn-Mayer films
Films set in New Jersey
American monster movies
1980s monster movies
Films set in New York City
Films set in North Carolina
Films shot in Atlantic City, New Jersey
Films shot in New York City
Films shot in North Carolina
Films scored by Alan Silvestri
Films produced by Dino De Laurentiis
Films produced by Martha De Laurentiis
1980s American films